Traveller is the debut studio album by American singer-songwriter Chris Stapleton. The album was produced by Dave Cobb and Stapleton, and was released on May 5, 2015, through Mercury Nashville.

Described by music publications as an old-school country, Southern rock record, Traveller received critical acclaim and earned Stapleton several awards. It was named Album of the Year at the 2015 Country Music Association Awards. Furthermore, it received a nomination at the 58th Grammy Awards for Album of the Year and a win for Best Country Album. The song "Traveller" also won Best Country Solo Performance. At the 2016 Academy of Country Music Awards it won Album of the Year, with the song "Nobody to Blame" also winning Song of the Year. It won the Billboard Music Award for Top Country Album in 2016 and 2017.

Traveller reached number one on the US Billboard 200 chart after the 2015 Country Music Association Awards, during which Stapleton and Justin Timberlake performed a well-received duet. The album has been certified quadruple platinum by the Recording Industry Association of America (RIAA) and has sold over 2.6 million copies in the United States by November 2019. It was eventually ranked by Billboard as the bestselling country album of the 2010s. It generated three singles: "Traveller", "Nobody to Blame", and "Parachute". "Nobody to Blame" reached the top 10 on the Country Airplay chart. The album track "Fire Away" was accompanied by a music video. Though not released as a radio single, album track "Tennessee Whiskey" garnered popularity following its performance at the aforementioned CMA awards, reaching number one on the Billboard Hot Country Songs chart and number 20 on the Hot 100.

Music and composition

The album is an old-school country record mixed with Southern rock. Tracks on the album features electric guitar, mandolin, and acoustic guitar. "The Devil Named Music" exclaims the hard life on the road, while "Might As Well Get Stoned" features resignation lyrics. Musically, "Sometimes I Cry" is a blues song, "Nobody to Blame" a mid-tempo country rock track, and "Fire Away" features a beat in a classic soul-ballad time signature. "Daddy Doesn't Pray Anymore" shrouds reflections about his father in the language of religious backsliding and was previously covered by Julie Roberts in 2013. In an interview for Rolling Stone, Stapleton commented "If somebody tells me it sounds dated, I'd say that's great, as long as the date is 1978. My favorite things are from then."

Stapleton wrote or co-wrote all but two of the album's 14 tracks. The album features a blues-influenced cover of David Allan Coe's single "Tennessee Whiskey", and Charlie Daniels' "Was It 26", written by Don Sampson.

Commercial performance
The album debuted on the Top Country Albums chart at number two, and the Billboard 200 at number 14, selling 27,000 copies in the week ending May 10.

Six months after the album was released, Chris Stapleton and Justin Timberlake performed "Tennessee Whiskey" at the 2015 Country Music Association Awards where Traveller won Album of the Year. Following the performance, sales for the album increased 6,000% and it re-entered the Billboard 200 at number one after being absent from the chart since September, with 177,000 equivalent album units (153,000 in pure album sales). According to Billboard, the surge in sales is owed to how a mass audience discovered Stapleton on the November 4 CMA Awards broadcast. Traveller is also the first debut country album to reach number one on the Billboard 200 in over four years, with Clear as Day (2011) by Scotty McCreery being the last. It became the first album to reenter the chart at number one. It remained at number one for a second week with 124,000 album-equivalent units, including 97,000 pure album sales. The album track "Tennessee Whiskey" topped the Hot Country Songs chart, and reached the top 20 on the Billboard Hot 100.

The album sold 685,000 copies in the United States in 2015. In February 2016, Traveller was certified platinum by the Recording Industry Association of America (RIAA), and double platinum in September. It became the fourth best-selling album of 2016 in the nation, and the top selling country album, with 1.04 million copies sold that year. The album surpassed the 2 million sales mark in the US in July 2017, and it was the second best-selling country album of 2017 (after Stapleton's second album From A Room: Volume 1. It hold the records for the most weeks atop the Americana/Folk Albums chart (81 in total as of August 2019). It topped the Billboard Year-End Top Country Albums chart in 2016 and 2017. It was certified quadruple platinum on July 24, 2019 for 4 million units in sales and streams. As of March 2020, the album has accrued 4.3 million units in the country in total, with 2.6 million copies in traditional album sales.

Critical reception

Traveller received critical acclaim upon its release. At Metacritic, which assigns a normalized rating out of 100 to reviews from music critics, the album has received an average score of 85, indicating "universal acclaim", based on 6 reviews. In a review for Billboard, editor Caitlin White gave the album four-out-of-five stars, describing Traveller as a "solemn album, the work of a man gripped by life's impermanence", noting "undercurrents of regret, loss and resignation" in songs like "Daddy Doesn't Pray Anymore", "Nobody to Blame" and "Devil Named Music". About the record's sound direction, she commented "Stapleton's songs are both rhythmic and nuanced, perhaps a by-product of years spent writing for others. They feature a cast of characters that remain likable even as they rush headlong into pursuit of ruin, fortune or chance." White concluded "it's a triumphant debut, encapsulating the grit of life, turning it into a hell of a journey." In Los Angeles Times, Randy Lewis wrote "Stapleton's trenchant pen combines with his soul-drenched rasp of a voice for a moving exploration of the panoply of emotions in the human experience."

Critics from Rolling Stone opined Traveller "encapsulates everything that makes him one of the most powerful and unique voices in country music today: gravelly, soulful and full of songs that ring like instant classics without ever resting too deeply in the past." In their year-end summary they stated "every track goes straight for the emotional jugular and give a glimpse inside a wildly introspective mind." Editor Owen R. Smith from The Seattle Times noted the instruments mandolin, banjo, pedal steel guitar "are all given room to shine, even when Stapleton dips his toe into some menacing country rock in "Nobody to Blame" or electrified bluesy swagger in "Might As Well Get Stoned.""

Accolades

Awards

Track listing
All tracks are produced by Dave Cobb and Chris Stapleton.

Personnel
Credits for Traveller adapted from AllMusic.

Musicians
 Dave Cobb – acoustic guitar, percussion
 J.T. Cure – bass guitar, upright bass
 Derek Mixon – drums, percussion
 Mickey Raphael – harmonica
 Chris Stapleton – acoustic guitar, electric guitar, mandolin, lead vocals
 Morgane Stapleton – background vocals 
 Robby Turner – pedal steel guitar
 Michael Webb – Mellotron, organ, piano

Technical personnel
 Steve Blackmon – assistant
 Sorrel Brigman – assistant
 Dave Cobb – producer
 Becky Fluke – photography
 Mary Hooper – design
 Pete Lyman – mastering
 Drew Long – assistant
 Vance Powell – engineer, mixing
 Ed Spear – assistant
 Chris Stapleton – producer
 Shane Stern – production coordination

Chart performance

Weekly charts

Year-end charts

Decade-end charts

Certifications

Release history

References

External links
 

2015 debut albums
Chris Stapleton albums
Mercury Nashville albums
Albums produced by Dave Cobb
Grammy Award for Best Country Album